The stocky pebblesnail (Somatogyrus crassus) is a species of very small freshwater snail with a gill and an operculum, an aquatic gastropod mollusk in the family Hydrobiidae. This species is endemic to the United States.  Its natural habitat is rivers.

References

Molluscs of the United States
Somatogyrus
Gastropods described in 1904
Taxonomy articles created by Polbot